Carl Keilhau (25 July 1919 – 20 December 1957) was a Norwegian author, poet and journalist.

Biography
Carl Keilhau was born at Oslo, Norway.
He was the son of librarian Wollert Keilhau and Anna Mathilde Østvold.
He attended  Fagerborg Upper Secondary School (1935-1938).
He worked as journalist for the newspapers Dagbladet, Verdens Gang and Morgenbladet, and was known under his pen name "Pirat". He made his literary debut in 1947 with the poetry collection Over broen. Among his other poetry collections are Vi kan ikke flykte from 1952, Nocturne from 1955, and Konsert i november from 1957. He was awarded the Sarpsborgprisen  literature prize  in 1951.

References

1919 births
1957 deaths
20th-century Norwegian poets
Norwegian male poets
Dagbladet people
Verdens Gang people
20th-century Norwegian male writers
20th-century Norwegian journalists
Burials at the Cemetery of Our Saviour